Ivel is an unincorporated community and coal town in Floyd County, Kentucky, United States.

A post office was established in the community in 1905. The town takes its name from the Ivy Creek.

References

Unincorporated communities in Floyd County, Kentucky
Unincorporated communities in Kentucky
Coal towns in Kentucky